Time of the Gypsies is a 1988 Yugoslav coming-of-age fantasy crime drama directed by Emir Kusturica. Filmed in Romani and Serbo-Croatian, Time of the Gypsies tells the story of a young Romani man with magical powers who is tricked into engaging in petty crime. It is widely considered to be one of Kusturica's best films. The film was recorded in Sarajevo, Skopje and Milan, by the Forum Sarajevo. The film was selected as the Yugoslav entry for the Best Foreign Language Film at the 62nd Academy Awards, but was not accepted as a nominee.

The film revolves around Perhan, a Romani teenager with telekinetic powers and his passage from childhood to adulthood which starts in a little village in Yugoslavia and ends in the criminal underworld of Milan. The film deals with magic realism.

The film's soundtrack was composed by Goran Bregović.

Plot
Perhan lives with his devoted grandmother Khatidza, his lame sister Danira and his dissolute uncle Merdzan. Khatidza possesses a level of supernatural powers (mainly healing) and Perhan himself inherited some minor telekinetic abilities. He wants to marry a girl named Azra, but her mother will not allow it, as Perhan is the illegitimate son of a Slovenian soldier who had an affair with Perhan's late mother. Ahmed, the "Gypsy sheik," comes to the village with his brothers. Merdzan loses his clothes playing cards with Ahmed's brothers, and comes home desperate for money so that he can repay. It is raining and not finding any money, he accuses the grandmother of hiding the money from him and lifts the frame of the house up (using a rope and a truck), so that it is suspended in mid-air as the rain comes down on Perhan, his grandmother and Danira. Very soon after, Khatidza is summoned to use her powers to save Ahmed's sick son, Roberto, which Khatidza does. For repayment, she proposes a deal with Ahmed - to pay for Danira's leg to be healed at a hospital in Ljubljana. Perhan goes with Danira, promising his grandmother not to leave her, but Ahmed asks where will he stay and convinces him to go to Milan. At first Perhan wants to make money honestly, but after being dragged through the mud, Perhan begins stealing and squirreling money away in a shack.

After being double-crossed by his brother Sadam, Ahmed appoints Perhan boss of the operation. Now relatively rich, Perhan goes home, where he is enraged to find Azra is pregnant. Perhan refuses to believe that the baby is his. They marry with the condition that she would sell the baby. Perhan is also disappointed to find that the house Ahmed promised to build him is not being built at all, and that Danira was not operated on, but forced to be a beggar as part of Ahmed's money operation. On their wedding night, Azra tells him the child is theirs, and was conceived when they made love on the Feast of St George. Still wearing her wedding dress, Azra dies after giving birth to a boy while levitating mid-air (a sign that the boy, as he inherited the powers, is indeed Perhan's). Because Ahmed leaves with the baby, which we discover later is also named Perhan, he is raised by Ahmed's crew.

After four years of searching, Perhan reunites with Danira in Rome, who leads him to Perhan Jr., whom Perhan now accepts as his child. Perhan drops the children off at the train station, promising to meet up with them after buying an accordion for his son and a present (sponges) for grandmother. The boy tells him he is mad at him because he will not return, and he will not get an accordion. Perhan assures him he will, "Cross my gypsy heart," but immediately runs out of the station to settle the score with Ahmed, who is about to be married. Perhan arrives at the wedding and kills Ahmed with a fork, using his telekinetic powers. He also kills one of Ahmed's brothers, but he is in turn killed by Ahmed's new wife. At the funeral, the grandmother passes out drinks to everyone and Perhan Jr. goes outside the house, peers through the window at his dead father, breaks the glass and steals the golden coins put on his father's eyes. Merdzan notices, and follows him out in the rain, as the child runs away hidden under a cardboard box. Merdzan is about to catch him up and pick up the board, but seems to have second thoughts, stops, and starts running toward the nearby church.

Cast
Davor Dujmović -  Perhan
Bora Todorović -  Ahmed
Ljubica Adžović - Khatidza

Awards

At the 1989 Cannes Film Festival, Emir Kusturica won the Best Director Award and the film was also nominated for a Palme d'Or (Golden Palm). At the 26th Guldbagge Awards in Sweden, it won the award for Best Foreign Film. In addition, Time of the Gypsies was nominated for Best Foreign Film at the 1990 César Awards in France.

See also
 List of Yugoslav films
 Films about immigration to Italy
 List of submissions to the 62nd Academy Awards for Best Foreign Language Film
 List of Yugoslav submissions for the Academy Award for Best Foreign Language Film
 Romani people in Serbia
 Romani people in Italy

References

External links

 

1988 films
1988 comedy-drama films
Magic realism films
Films directed by Emir Kusturica
Films scored by Goran Bregović
Yugoslav fantasy films
Romani culture
Romani-language films
1988 fantasy films
Serbo-Croatian-language films
Serbian fantasy films
Italian fantasy films
1980s Italian-language films
Serbian comedy-drama films
British comedy-drama films
Films set in Milan
Best Foreign Film Guldbagge Award winners
Films about immigration to Italy
Columbia Pictures films
Films set in Serbia
Films set in Yugoslavia
Films about telekinesis
Films about Romani people
1980s British films
1980s Italian films